Lida Arakelyan (born 11 July 1999), better known by her stage name Lidushik, is an Armenian singer, best known for songs such as "Poqeri Ashkharh" (2008), "Yerg em Horinel" (2009), "Mankutyun" (2010), and "Pare" (2011).

Life and work
Lida Arakelyan was born on 11 July 1999 in Yerevan, the capital city of Armenia. Lidushik started singing at the age of 3, and has been a part of the children's pop/pop-folk ensemble "Arevik" from 2004 to late-2010. She adopted the stage name of Lidushik in early 2005, and is one of the youngest people in Armenia to ever gain popularity. In 2011, Lidushik took part in the fourth annual contest for child singers, New Wave Junior (Armenian: Մանկական Նոր Ալիք), and got the special prize from the television channel RaiUno which let her to take part in the popular Italian TV show "Ti lascio una canzone."

In 2013 she had her first solo concert in Gyumri, which was followed by a second solo concert in Glendale, California, third in Yerevan, fourth solo concert at the end of the year in Pasadena, California,  and fifth in Vanadzor in 2014.  Also, she took part in New Wave Junior again as a guest, performing with Tamara Gverdsiteli, Dominick Jocker and Nikolay Baskov.

Discography

Albums
Kids' World (2012)
Im Poqrik Hayastan (2015)

Singles

Music videos
Poqreri Ashkharh (2008)
Yerg em Horinel (2010)
Pare (2011)
Mama (feat. Nune Yesayan) (2012)
Tik-Tak (2013)
Qo Nman (feat. Diana Kalashova) (2013)
La La La (2014)
Im Poqrik Hayastan (2014)
Hayastani Nor Patani (2015)
Srtum Arajin Ser (2017)
Yes u du (2019)
Liqy Ser (2021)

References

External links
 Official website

Living people
1999 births
21st-century Armenian women singers
Musicians from Yerevan
Armenian folk-pop singers
Armenian child singers